Spijkerboor is a village in the Dutch province of Drenthe. It is a part of the municipality of Aa en Hunze, and lies about 16 km northeast of Assen.

The village was first mentioned in 1792 as "de Spykerboor", and means meandering river. Spijkerboor was located at one of the locks in the river where you had to pay toll.

References

Populated places in Drenthe
Aa en Hunze